The 2006 South American Cross Country Championships took place on March 4–5, 2006.  The races were held at the Naval Base in Mar del Plata, Argentina.  A detailed report of the event was given for the IAAF.

Complete results results for junior and youth competitions, and medal winners were published.

Medallists

Race results

Senior men's race (12 km)

Note: Athletes in parentheses did not score for the team result.

Men's short race (4 km)

†: The placings are ambiguous.

Note: Athletes in parentheses did not score for the team result.

Junior (U20) men's race (8 km)

†: The placings are ambiguous.

Note: Athletes in parentheses did not score for the team result.
†: The points scored are ambiguous.

Youth (U18) men's race (4 km)

†: The placings are ambiguous.

Note: Athletes in parentheses did not score for the team result.
†: The points scored are ambiguous.

Senior women's race (8 km)

Note: Athletes in parentheses did not score for the team result.

Women's short race (4 km)

Note: Athletes in parentheses did not score for the team result.

Junior (U20) women's race (6 km)

Note: Athletes in parentheses did not score for the team result.

Youth (U18) women's race (3 km)

Note: Athletes in parentheses did not score for the team result.

Medal table (unofficial)

Note: Totals include both individual and team medals, with medals in the team competition counting as one medal.

Participation
According to an unofficial count, 142 athletes from 10 countries participated.

 (31)
 (3)
 (19)
 (27)
 (15)
 (4)
 (10)
 Perú (5)
 (18)
 (10)

See also
 2006 in athletics (track and field)

References

External links
 GBRathletics

South American Cross Country Championships
South American Cross Country Championships
South American Cross Country Championships
South American Cross Country Championships
2006 in South American sport
Cross country running in Argentina
March 2006 sports events in South America